James William Pearce (born 27 November 1947) is an English former professional footballer. Pearce played in the position of winger for Tottenham Hotspur and represented England at schoolboy level.

Football career
Pearce joined Spurs as an apprentice in June 1965. A dependable, skilful winger he made a total of 193 appearances for the club including 53 as substitute and scoring on 35 occasions. Pearce featured in the winning 1973 Football League Cup Final side, and was substitute in the 1971 Football League Cup Final, and sub in both legs of the 1972 UEFA Cup Final. He retired from football through injury in 1973.

Honours
1971 Football League Cup Final Winner
1972 UEFA Cup Final Winner
1973 Football League Cup Final Winner
England Schoolboys

References

External links
Photo of Jim
Spurs players
Tottenham Hotspur F.C A-Z of players Retrieved 3 December 2012 

1947 births
Footballers from Tottenham
Tottenham Hotspur F.C. players
Living people
English Football League players
English footballers
UEFA Cup winning players
Association football wingers